Mephibosheth (Biblical Hebrew: , Məfīḇōšeṯ, also called Meribaal, Mərīḇ-Baʻal), or Miphibosheth, was the son of Jonathan—and, thus, a grandson of Saul—mentioned in the Biblical Books of Samuel and Chronicles.

Life

Mephibosheth was five years old when both his father and grandfather died at the Battle of Mount Gilboa. After the deaths of Saul and Jonathan, Mephibosheth's nurse took him and fled in panic. In her haste, the child fell, or was dropped while fleeing. After that, he was unable to walk.

After the accident, Mephibosheth was carried with the rest of his family beyond the Jordan to the mountains of Gilead, where he found a refuge in the house of Machir ben-Ammiel, a powerful Gadite or Manassite sheik at Lo-debar, not far from Mahanaim, which during the reign of his uncle Ishbosheth was the head-quarters of his family.

Some years later, after his accession to the kingship of the United Monarchy, King David sought "someone of the house of Saul, to whom I may show the kindness of God" and Mephibosheth was brought to him. Old Testament scholar Walter Brueggemann says the mention of Mephibosheth's disability may have been added to show that he was not a military or political threat to David.

David restored Saul's inheritance to Mephibosheth and permitted him to live within his palace in Jerusalem.

Name
He is called Mephibosheth, meaning "from the mouth of shame", in the Books of Samuel while the Books of Chronicles ( and ) call him Meribbaal. Arnold Gottfried Betz and David Noel Freedman argue that Memphibaal, a name preserved in the Lucianic recension may actually be the original name of Jonathan's son, while Meribbaal may originally refer to one of  Saul's sons.

There is some scholarly agreement that Mephibosheth replaced Meribbaal (or Memphibaal) in order to conceal the theophoric name "baal", a reference to a Canaanite deity, which became taboo.

Footnotes

References

10th-century BCE Hebrew people
House of Saul
People associated with David
People whose existence is disputed
People with paraplegia
Royalty and nobility with disabilities